Lesticus restrictus is a species of ground beetle in the subfamily Pterostichinae. It was described by Dubault, Lassalle & Roux in 2008.

References

Lesticus
Beetles described in 2008